The 2022 Campeonato Alagoano (officially the Série A Alagoano 2022 InoveBanco for sponsorship reasons) was the 92nd edition of the top football league in Alagoas organized by FAF. It began on 20 January and ended on 13 April 2022. CSA were the defending champions but were eliminated in the semi-finals.

The finals were played between CRB and ASA on 9 and 13 April 2022. CRB won 4–1 on aggregate securing their 32nd title.

Format
In the first stage, each team played the other seven teams in a single round-robin tournament. Top four teams advanced to the semi-finals, while the bottom team was relegated to the 2023 Campeonato Alagoano Sub 23 – Série B. Semi-finals, third place finals and finals were played on a home-and-away two-legged basis with the best overall performance team hosting the second leg. If tied on aggregate, the penalty shoot-out would be used to determine the winners.

Champions qualified for the 2023 Copa do Brasil and 2023 Copa do Nordeste, while runners-up qualified for the 2023 Copa do Brasil. 2022 Campeonato Alagoano third place and 2022 Copa Alagoas champions (Cruzeiro de Arapiraca) played a two-legged play-off to determine the third team qualified for the 2023 Copa do Brasil. If tied on aggregate, the penalty shoot-out would be used to determine the winners. Best team not already qualified for 2023 Série A, Série B or Série C qualified for 2023 Campeonato Brasileiro Série D.

Teams

First stage

Final stage

Bracket

Semi-finals

|}

Matches

CRB qualified for 2023 Copa do Brasil

ASA qualified for 2023 Copa do Brasil

3rd place final

Finals

As champions, CRB qualified for 2023 Copa do Nordeste

2023 Copa do Brasil play-off

CSA qualified for 2023 Copa do Brasil

Overall table

Top goalscorers

References

2022 in Brazilian football leagues
2022 in Brazilian football
Campeonato Alagoano